Hermione most commonly refers to:
 Hermione Granger, a character in Harry Potter
 Hermione (given name), a female given name
 Hermione (mythology), only daughter of Menelaus and Helen in Greek mythology and original bearer of the name

Hermione may also refer to:

Arts and literature
 Cadmus et Hermione, an opera by Jean-Baptiste Lully
 HERmione, a novel by American poet, Hilda "H.D." Doolittle
 "Letter to Hermione", a song by David Bowie on David Bowie (1969 album)
 Hermione (opera), Max Bruch 1872

Characters
 Hermione, a character in William Shakespeare's play The Winter's Tale
 Hermione Lodge, mother of Veronica Lodge, in Archie Comics

Biology
 Aurotalis hermione, a moth found in Zambia and part of the family Crambidae
 Cycloponympha hermione, a moth known from Xinavane, Mozambique, and part of the family Lyonetiidae
 Epiphryne (syn. Hermione), a genus of moth in the family Geometridae
 Eurata hermione, a moth that is part of subfamily Arctiinae
 Hipparchia hermione, a butterfly of the family Nymphalidae
 Pleurotomella hermione, a species of sea snail of the family Raphitomidae
 Tropidion hermione, a beetle species of the family Cerambycidae

Ships
 French ship Hermione, twelve ships of the French Navy
 French frigate Hermione (1779), a French frigate that carried La Fayette to join the American fight for independence in 1780
 French frigate Hermione (2014), a replica of the 1779 original, built in France from 1996 to 2012, launched in 2014
 , four ships of the Royal Navy 
 Spanish frigate Hermione, an 18th-century frigate of the Spanish Navy

Places
 Hermione (Argolis), a town of ancient Argolis, Greece
 Ermioni, a modern resort town on the site the ancient Hermione

Other uses
 121 Hermione, an asteroid
 Hermione (Tallulah, Louisiana), a Greek Revival building built in 1855 in Tallulah, Louisiana
 Hermiones or Irminones, a group of early Germanic tribes
 Hotspot Ecosystem Research and Man's Impact On European Seas (HERMIONE), an EU-funded deep-sea research project
 Sony Ericsson P990, a mobile phone codenamed Hermione
 USS Hawk (IX-14), formerly called Hermione
 Hermionê Grammatikê (translation: ‘Hermione the literary lady' or 'Hermione the language teacher’), a mummy on display at Girton College, Cambridge

See also
Ermione, an opera by Gioachino Rossini 
Hermine (disambiguation)